Frede Schött (born 28 December 1970) is a former speedway rider from Denmark.

Speedway career 
Schött was a World Under-21 finalist in 1989 and 1991. He rode in the top tier of British Speedway from 1990 to 2004, riding primarily for Belle Vue Aces. He was an integral part of the Belle Vue Aces team that won the league during the 1993 British League season.

References 

Living people
1970 births
Danish speedway riders
Belle Vue Aces riders
Edinburgh Monarchs riders
People from Kolding
Sportspeople from the Region of Southern Denmark